Bernkastel-Kues is a Verbandsgemeinde ("collective municipality") in the district Bernkastel-Wittlich, in Rhineland-Palatinate, Germany. The seat of the Verbandsgemeinde is in Bernkastel-Kues. The Verbandsgemeinde lies on both banks of the river Moselle, between Trier and Koblenz. The entire Verbandsgemeinde is 249 square kilometers large and has 27000 inhabitants. 

The Verbandsgemeinde Bernkastel-Kues consists of the following Ortsgemeinden ("local municipalities"):
Bernkastel-Kues, Town
Brauneberg
Burgen
Erden
Gornhausen
Graach an der Mosel
Hochscheid
Kesten
Kleinich
Kommen
Lieser
Lösnich
Longkamp
Maring-Noviand
Minheim 
Monzelfeld 
Mülheim 
Neumagen-Dhron
Piesport 
Ürzig 
Veldenz 
Wintrich 
Zeltingen-Rachtig

External links
 bernkastel-kues.de

Bernkastel-Kues